Tropidophora michaudi is a species of land snail with a gill and an operculum, a terrestrial gastropod mollusk in the family Pomatiidae.

This species is endemic to Mauritius.

Original description 
Tropidophora fimbriata was originally described as Cyclostoma Michaudi by Jean-Pierre Sylvestre de Grateloup in 1840.

Grateloup's original text (the type description) in Latin language reads as follows:

Shell description

References
This article incorporates public domain text from reference.

Further reading 
  Pfeiffer L. K. G. (1846). Die gedeckelten Lungenschnecken : (Helicinaceae et Cyclostomaceae): in Abbildungen nach der Natur mit Beschreibungen. II. volume. Bauer und Raspe, Nürnberg. page 138.

michaudi
Gastropods described in 1840
Endemic fauna of Mauritius
Taxonomy articles created by Polbot